Mario Pollhammer (born 20 June 1989) is an Austrian footballer who plays as a right-back for FC Gleisdorf 09.

References

Living people
1989 births
Austrian footballers
Association football defenders
Austrian Football Bundesliga players
Grazer AK players
SC Ritzing players
SC Wiener Neustadt players